Tom Stubbe (26 May 1981 in Blankenberge) is a Belgian former professional road bicycle racer. Stubbe started as a professional in 2005.

Palmarès 

2004
 1st, Overall, Tour du Loir-et-Cher
 3rd, National Amateur Time Trial Championship
2006
 3rd, Overall, Tour de l'Avenir

External links 
 Official website
 

1981 births
Living people
Belgian male cyclists
Cyclists from West Flanders
People from Blankenberge